Living on the Edge is an album by American jazz saxophonist Dewey Redman featuring performances recorded in 1989 for the Italian Black Saint label.

Reception
The Allmusic review by Scott Yanow awarded the album 4 stars stating "The great tenor Dewey Redman has always been a versatile player and he really gets a chance to show off his individuality on this set... this is an easily recommended set of inside/outside music".

Track listing
All compositions by Dewey Redman except as indicated
 "Boo Boodoop" - 9:46 
 "Mirror Windows" - 8:32 
 "Blues for J.A.M. Part 1" - 5:02 
 "If I Should Lose You" (Ralph Rainger, Leo Robin) - 8:07 
 "As One" - 5:58 
 "Lazy Bird" (John Coltrane) - 6:20 
Recorded at the A & R Recording Studio in New York City on September 13 & 14, 1989

Personnel
Dewey Redman - tenor saxophone, alto saxophone
Geri Allen - piano
Cameron Brown - bass
Eddie Moore - drums

References

Black Saint/Soul Note albums
Dewey Redman albums
1991 albums